Cosimo "Nino" Antonelli (July 23, 1925 – January 16, 2014) was an Italian water polo player who competed in the 1956 Summer Olympics. He was born in Venice.

In 1956 he was a member of the Italian team which finished fourth in the Olympic tournament. He played one match as goalkeeper.

See also
 Italy men's Olympic water polo team records and statistics
 List of men's Olympic water polo tournament goalkeepers

References

External links
 
 "Antonelli Cosimo (detto Nino)", Lazio Wiki

1925 births
2014 deaths
Italian male water polo players
Water polo goalkeepers
Olympic water polo players of Italy
Water polo players at the 1956 Summer Olympics
Sportspeople from Venice